Liverpool Heart and Chest Hospital NHS Foundation Trust is an NHS foundation trust located in the suburb of Broadgreen within the city of Liverpool, England. It manages the Liverpool Heart and Chest Hospital which serves the population of Merseyside, North West England, North Wales and the Isle of Man but also provides some specialist services for patients from all areas of the United Kingdom performing up to 12,000 procedures a year.

Services 
The services the Trust provides services include:

Percutaneous Coronary Interventions (PCI)
Pacemakers and ICD (Implantable Cardioverter/Defibrillator)
Electrophysiology (EP) studies and Ablation
Coronary Artery Bypass Grafts (CABG)
Heart Valve Replacements
Aortic Aneurysm Operations
Thoracic Operations
Upper GI Operations
Respiratory Medicine (including Adult Cystic Fibrosis)
Respiratory procedures
Cancer Services

Awards
Awards received by the Trust include:
CHKS Top Hospitals Data Quality Award for Specialist Trusts 2015 
Advancing Quality Awards: Best Performing Trust (Specialist Cardiac Centre)
Chief Nursing Officer Summit Award 2014: Compassion in Practice Award
Joint first for Clinical Digital Maturity Index 2013
Best Hospital Provider 2012
Enhancing Patient Dignity 2012
Quality and Productivity 2011

Performance
It was named by the Health Service Journal as one of the top hundred NHS trusts to work for in 2015.  At that time it had 1335 full-time equivalent staff and a sickness absence rate of 4.13%. 92% of staff recommend it as a place for treatment and 69% recommended it as a place to work.

The Care Quality Commission awarded LHCH an 'Outstanding' rating following their inspection in summer 2016. 2019 saw Liverpool Heart and Chest Hospital become one of only five NHS service providers to receive the 'Outstanding' rating twice, resulting from a CQC inspection in February 2019.

See also
 List of hospitals in England
 List of NHS trusts

References 

NHS foundation trusts